Halaçlı can refer to:

 Halaçlı, Kastamonu
 Halaçlı, Kızılırmak